Adirondack Trust Company is the largest independent community bank in Saratoga County, New York, USA. Adirondack Trust's 167 full-time employees own the company, which offers banking, loans and investment services, along with insurance through its Amsure subsidiary.  As of December 2020, the bank reported almost $1.5 billion in assets, and over $1.3 billion in deposits, across 13 branches.

Also as of 2020, the bank's CEO is Charles V. Wait, Jr. and the chairman is his father Charles V. Wait. The bank has mostly been led by the same family for four generations.

Background
Adirondack Trust was founded in 1901 by New York State Senator Edgar T. Brackett with capital of $100,000 and surplus of $50,000. It played a large role in transforming Saratoga Springs from a small "boom and bust" town into a thriving city. In January, 1902, it concluded a $100,000 mortgage (around $ in 2020 dollars) with the machinery manufacturer Baker and Shevlin of Ballston Spa, New York (now Espey Manufacturing), which was considered a "big mortgage" at the time. In 1906 the bank experienced a "run", blamed on "Italians", which garnered nationwide publicity. The bank recovered, however, and in 1908 was dubbed "the largest and richest banking institution in the State north of Albany."

Through the years, it has become the highest rated bank in Saratoga County, both in CRA (Community Reinvestment Act) and in safety and soundness. Adirondack Trust Company has been named one of the 100 safest banks in the country, and the safest bank in New York, by Money magazine. Following this rating it had an influx of requests to open accounts, which it had to turn away because it only accepts accounts within its local area.

Adirondack Trust Company headquarters is in the Broadway Historic District and is part of its listing in the National Register of Historic Places; its building is a marble-faced 1916 Beaux-Arts bank building by Alfred Hopkins featuring Tiffany bronze doors and chandeliers. All the decorations have Adirondack themes. In celebration of its centennial the bank commissioned a mural from artist Anne Diggory. The 22-by-9-foot mural, titled The Flume, continuing the Adirondack theme, was installed in 2001.

The building held a time capsule placed in its cornerstone in 1916 and opened 100 years later. The capsule included newspapers reporting World War I, brochures of nearby Congress Park, the bank's 1902 founding ledger, and a letter from State Senator Edgar T. Brackett. The capsule was replaced and new items include a visitor's guide, Saratoga national historic coins, modern copies of The Saratogian and a digital copy of a statement.

In 2008 they acquired Amsure Associates Inc.

Civic engagement
In 2021, the company sponsored the Saratoga Performing Arts Center's virtual exhibit “The 2021 Adirondack Trust Company Festival of Young Artists” Online Gallery, featuring 80 inspiring student creations from the Capital Region's brightest young dancers, musicians, singers, poets, and visual artists.

Discriminatory practices
Adirondack Trust Company was the subject of a New York State Department of Financial Services investigation into discriminatory lending practices. The investigation found that the "Bank's specific policies and practices of allowing automobile dealers to markup a consumer's interest rate without any justification on the basis of objective credit-related factors above the Bank's established risk-based Buy Rate resulted in a disparate impact on the basis of race and national origin that was not justified by legitimate business need". The investigation further found that, "Adirondack maintained a policy which permitted dealer markups of up to 2.00%, at the dealer's sole discretion and not controlled by the adjustments for creditworthiness and other objective criteria already reflected in the Bank's risk based Buy Rate". As a result of the findings, Adirondack Trust Company had to pay a total civil monetary penalty of $275,000. To address the significant number of individual concerns, restitution was calculated for each eligible as described in the consent decree. As part of the settlement, the bank contributed $50,000 to local community development organizations.

Adirondack Trust Company has also been accused of discrimination in the administration of its Paycheck Protection Program loans.

References

External links
Official web page

Banks based in New York (state)
Companies based in Saratoga County, New York
1901 establishments in New York (state)
National Register of Historic Places in Saratoga County, New York